La Reine High School (LRHS) was an all-girls' Catholic high school in Suitland in unincorporated Prince George's County, Maryland, under the Roman Catholic Archdiocese of Washington.

Its students lived in Maryland and Washington, D.C.

The school opened in 1960. In 1992 it closed, with its students going to Bishop McNamara High School, previously only for boys. The school's stained glass windows, which were created in the 1950s, were given to Our Lady of the Presentation Catholic Church in Poolesville, Maryland.

References

Catholic secondary schools in Maryland
Schools in Prince George's County, Maryland
Girls' schools in Maryland
Educational institutions established in 1960
1960 establishments in Maryland
Educational institutions disestablished in 1992
1992 disestablishments in Maryland